Matthew P. Bell is an American politician from the state of Indiana. A member of the Republican Party, he previously served in the Indiana House of Representatives from 2005 to 2010. He represented Allen County, Noble County, Whitley County in the state legislature. In 2012, Bell was named President of Ivy Tech Corporate College. In 2013, Bell was named President of the Casino Association of Indiana. He previously served on the Indiana Gaming Commission from 2011 to 2014.

References

External links
 Project Vote Smart – Representative Matthew Bell (IN) profile
 Matthew Bell at Ballotpedia
 Office website

Living people
Republican Party members of the Indiana House of Representatives
1974 births